Fishbourne may refer to:

Places
 Fishbourne, Isle of Wight, a village
 Fishbourne, West Sussex, a village
 Fishbourne (UK electoral ward)
 Fishbourne Roman Palace, an archaeological site in West Sussex

People
 William Fishbourn (1677–1742, also spelled Fishbourne), a mayor of Philadelphia

See also
 Fishburn (disambiguation)
 Fishburne (disambiguation)